Amarduiyeh (also Romanized as Amardū’īyeh) is a village in Jowzam Rural District, Dehaj District, Shahr-e Babak County, Kerman Province, Iran. At the 2006 census, its population was 72, in 21 families.

References 

Populated places in Shahr-e Babak County